Conviviality, or Convivialism, is the ability of individuals to interact creatively and autonomously with others and their environment to satisfy their own needs. This interpretation is related to, but distinct from, several synonyms and cognates, including in French the enjoyment of the social company of others (convivialité), Catalan social cohesion policy (Convivència), and its contemporary understanding in English of living together with difference and diversity (see section “Contemporary Uses in Academia”). This interpretation was introduced by Ivan Illich as a direct contrast to industrial productivity that produces consumers that are alienated from the way that things are produced. Its focus on joyful simple living, the localisation of production systems, links to Marxist economics, and Illich’s simultaneous criticism of overconsumption have resulted in conviviality being taken up by a range of academic and social movements, including as a pillar of degrowth theory and practice.

History/origins

French root (convivialité) 
One root of conviviality originated in 19th‐century France. Convivialité is very common in contemporary French and has also established itself in English as a common loanword, as well as more recently as a term in discussions about cohabitation in immigrant societies. Its coinage can be traced back to Jean Anthelme Brillat‐Savarin and his book Physiologie du goût from the year 1825. The gastrophilosopher understood conviviality as the situation, common at the table, when different people come together over a good long meal, and time passes swiftly in excited conversations.

See also Social connection.

Spanish root (convivencia) 
In Spanish, convivencia has long been interpreted literally as “living in the company of others” but in 1948 Américo Castro introduced la convivencia to mean the peaceful coexistence between different religious groups in Spain between the eighth and fifteenth centuries.

Ivan Illich 
As understood here, the term conviviality was introduced by Ivan Illich in his 1973 book, Tools for Conviviality. Illich recognised that the term in English was more likely to be associated with “tipsy jolliness” but derived his definition from the French and Spanish cognates, resulting in an interpretation that he felt was closer to a modern version of eutrapelia. Illich introduced the term as the opposite of industrial productivity, with conviviality indicating a society where individual autonomy and creativity dominated. This was contrasted with industrialised societies where individuals are reduced to “mere consumers”, unable to choose what is produced or how things are made in a world governed by a “radical monopoly”  that divided the population into experts that could use the tools and laypeople that could not.

As the title of the book suggests, the initial focus for Illich was how industrial tools and the expertise required to operate them constrained individuals’ autonomy, also arguing that these tools alienated individuals from the production processes of goods and services that shape our daily lives and led to the distortion of use values into exchange values.

Illich had a broad interpretation of tools as rationally designed devices. These included hardware used to produce goods and services that ranged from small scale items like drills to “large machines like cars and power stations”, but also productive institutions (like factories) and also productive systems that created what he called “intangible commodities…[like] education, health, knowledge or decisions”. Examples of non-convivial tools that Illich was railing against included open-pit mines, road networks and schools, this last example linking to his previous work critiquing mass education systems Deschooling Society. By contrast, convivial tools were those that promoted and extended autonomy, including most hand tools, bicycles, and telephones. Convivial tools share many similarities with the intermediate technology or ‘technology with a human face’ described in Small is Beautiful by Illich’s contemporary EF Schumacher. Indeed, in his 2012 book 'La sociedad de la abundancia frugal' Serge Latouche highlights the “human scale” of convivial tools.  

In the 1978 collection of essays published as 'Towards a History of Needs' Illich moved away from a focus on the tools of conviviality to explore the politics of conviviality which he defined as “the struggle for an equitable distribution of the liberty to generate use-values” that prioritised the liberty of those “least advantaged”. Herein, he focussed on socially critical thresholds that delimited whether conviviality was possible and argued that such thresholds should be translated into society-wide limits.

Contemporary uses in academia 
In the early 21st Century, the term conviviality has been used in a variety of contexts and with a variety of interpretations. However, there is a common understanding which is dominant in the definitions and interpretations of the term: the idea of living together with difference. This concept is employed to analyse the everyday experiences, social encounters, interdependencies and community integration of people living in diverse communities or urban settings. This understanding of conviviality is enshrined in the open access book “Conviviality at the Crossroads: The Poetics and Politics of Everyday Encounters”, which was published in 2020. This multi-authored book focuses on how people live with and are at ease with each other’s differences in diverse societies. It claims there is an urgent need to bring the three concepts of conviviality, cosmopolitanism and creolisation back into focus and into dialogue with each other.

Recent understandings of conviviality also often include analyses of racial difference, structural inequality and divergent histories within a multicultural or multi-racial community or urban space, and how these factors impact conviviality and community cohesion in both positive and negative ways. Scholars also analyse the use of public space and architecture in terms of its impact on conviviality in such diverse communities. The focus on these issues has been referred to as the “convivial turn” in academia.

Conviviality has also been applied to online contexts, in analyses of the ways in which people relate to each other and build communities online.

Contemporary movements

Anti-Utilitarian Movement and Convivialism 
Alain Caillé, a French sociologist and founding member of the Anti-Utilitarian Movement in Social Sciences (MAUSS), defines convivialism as a broad-based humanist, civic, and political philosophy that spells out the normative principles that sustain the art of living together at the beginning of the twenty-first century. The “ism” in “convivialism” makes clear that, on a theoretical level, the systematization of social and political-theoretical perspectives must stand in the foreground. The focus is consequently a dual one: convivialism can be seen as a social scientific or political idea, while conviviality can be seen as a lived praxis. Alain Caillé published in 2020 “The Second Convivialist Manifesto: Towards a Post-Neoliberal World”, signed by three hundred intellectuals from thirty-three countries.

Degrowth 
Conviviality is recognised as one of the core concepts of the Degrowth movement, appearing in representative texts such as Degrowth: A Vocabulary for a New Era. The understanding of conviviality within degrowth is strongly influenced by the work of Ivan Illich (discussed above), namely his critique of development and overconsumption and his promotion of a society which values “joyful sobriety and liberating austerity”, creating and using “responsibly limited” convivial tools. Illich’s understanding of convivial tools as emancipatory, democratic and responsive to direct human needs stands in direct contrast to society’s current dependence on energy slaves, experts and the growth-based capitalist model of production for its tools and technologies. These ideas, and particularly this conceptualisation of conviviality, are a central part of Degrowth theory: as such, Illich’s work is considered one of the early “intellectual roots of Degrowth”.

Most texts that discuss conviviality in the recent Degrowth literature are focused on technologies (including digital technologies), as an expansion or adaptation of Illich’s focus on convivial tools. It is generally accepted within the literature that any technologies suitable for a degrowth society must be convivial. To this end, Andrea Vetter has developed the Matrix for Convivial Technology (MCT) as a Degrowth-oriented (convivial) tool for self-assessment of tools and technologies, political education and research.

Conviviality is also employed in the Degrowth literature to describe things such as public spaces, goods, conservation movements, and even humans. For example, Giorgos Kallis, a prominent Degrowth scholar, refers to “...convivial goods, such as new public squares, open spaces, community gardens, etc (Latouche, 2009),” and the “convivial yet simple and content, enlightened human” as the ideal “Degrowth human”). Although less common than Degrowth literature that explores conviviality in terms of tools and technologies, there are various examples of conviviality being used as a characteristic of many aspects of a Degrowth society, including society itself. Indeed, some scholars describe the transition to a convivial society as one of the three core objectives of Degrowth.

Appropriate Technology Movement 
Based on the “intermediate technology” by the economist Ernst Friedrich "Fritz" Schumacher in his work Small is beautiful, the Appropriate Technology movement encompasses convivial technological choice, to promote characteristics such as autonomy, energy efficiency, decentralization, local production and sustainable development.

Incompleteness 
Francis Nyamnjoh uses the concept of conviviality in his essay on incompleteness. For Nyamnjoh incompleteness is "the normal order of things", and that “things, words, deeds and beings are always incomplete, not because of absences but because of their possibilities”. It is because of these possibilities that we are driven us towards collaboration, interconnectedness and interdependency as we try supplement our own desire to fulfil our endless possibilities through conviviality.

Conviviality in art and design 
The various interpretations of conviviality have also attracted the attention of artists and designers across the world. Recent exhibitions and collaborations centred on one or more interpretations of conviviality include:

 2009: The way of tea: an art of conviviality at Kube in Poole, UK.
 2012: Tools for Conviviality at The Power Plant in Toronto, Canada
 2013: Gordian Conviviality at Import Projects, Berlin, Germany
 2017–2021 4Cs: From Conflict to Conviviality through Creativity and Culture. An international collaboration between artists and academics
 2018: ‘Convivial Tools’ at The Design Museum, in London, UK
 2018: ‘Community, Care and Conviviality: Freemasonry in Lithgow’ at Eskbank House Museum, in Lithgow, Australia
 2020: Anna Ehrenstein - Tools for Conviviality at C/O Berlin in Berlin, Germany

See also 

 Serge Latouche
 EF Schumacher
 Degrowth
 Alain Caillé
 Gift economy
 Criticism of technology
 Post-industrial society
 Lee Felsenstein

References 

Degrowth
Anti-consumerism
Simple living
Management cybernetics